Taungpulu Tawya Kaba-Aye Sayadaw U Nandiya (20 March 1897– 7 June 1986 ) was an influential Theravada Buddhist monk. Taungpulu Sayadaw was born in Tesu Village, Wundwin Township of Myanmar. He was the eldest chief of U Yan and Daw Shwe The. His childhood name was Maung Paw Lar.

He was founder of the Taungpulu Kaba Aye Monastery in Boulder Creek, California.

References 

1897 births
1986 deaths
Burmese Buddhist monks
People from Mandalay Region
20th-century Buddhist monks